In mathematics, the ring of integers of an algebraic number field  is the ring of all algebraic integers contained in . An algebraic integer is a root of a monic polynomial with integer coefficients: .

The ring of integers  is the simplest possible ring of integers. Namely,  where  is the field of rational numbers.

The next simplest example is the ring of Gaussian integers , consisting of complex numbers whose real and imaginary parts are integers. It is the ring of integers in the number field  of Gaussian rationals, consisting of complex numbers whose real and imaginary parts are rational numbers. Like the rational integers,  is a Euclidean domain. 

The ring of integers of an algebraic number field is the unique maximal order in the field. It is always a Dedekind domain.

Properties 
The ring of integers  is a finitely-generated -module.  Indeed, it is a free -module, and thus has an integral basis, that is a basis  of the -vector space  such that each element  in  can be uniquely represented as

Examples

Computational tool 
A useful tool for computing the integral closure of the ring of integers in an algebraic field  is the discriminant.

Cyclotomic extensions 

Quadratic extensions 
This can be found by computing the minimal polynomial of an arbitrary element  where .

Multiplicative structure
In a ring of integers, every element has a factorization into irreducible elements, but the ring need not have the property of unique factorization: for example, in the ring of integers , the element 6 has two essentially different factorizations into irreducibles:

A ring of integers is always a Dedekind domain, and so has unique factorization of ideals into prime ideals.

The units of a ring of integers  is a finitely generated abelian group by Dirichlet's unit theorem. A set of torsion-free generators is called a set of fundamental units.

Generalization
If  is the completion of an algebraic number field, its ring of integers is the completion of the latter's ring of integers. The ring of integers of an algebraic number field may be characterised as the elements which are integers in every non-archimedean completion.

For example, the -adic integers  are the ring of integers of the -adic numbers .

See also 

 Minimal polynomial (field theory)
 Integral closure – gives a technique for computing integral closures

Notes

Citations

References

 
 

 

Ring theory
Algebraic number theory